Strahler is a surname. Notable people with the surname include:

 Arthur Newell Strahler (1918–2002), American geoscience professor
 Mike Strahler (1947–2016), American baseball player
 Adolf Straehler (1829–1897), sometimes Adolf Strähler, Silesier forester and botanist

See also
 Strahler number